The Para-commando Anti-Tank Company, usually shortened to ATk Company was a formation of the Belgian Army and part of the Para-commando Regiment. In 1994, it was merged with the 3rd Lancers Squadron to form the 3rd Parachute Lancers Regiment.

Formation
The ATk Company was formed on March 1, 1963 in the barracks of 2nd Commando Battalion at Flawinne. The Company was initially equipped with French-made ENTAC missiles mounted on Jeeps, but in 1979 received new MILAN missiles.

Operations

Congo

Somalia
As part of the UNOSOM II mission in Somalia, the ATk Company, equipped with CVR(T) Scorpion tanks, played a significant role in the mission's success. As a United Nations mission, all vehicles were painted white with the Belgian tricolor on the side. The ATk Company was based in the region of Jilib for the duration of its mission from 4 August 1993 to 24 December 1993.

Disbandment
Only one month after returning from Operation Silver Back in Rwanda, the Paracommando ATk Company was amalgamated with the 3rd Squadron of Parachute Lancers to form the 3rd Parachute Lancers Regiment on May 27, 1994. This move was made as part of the restructuring of the Paracommando Regiment to Paracommando Brigade.

References

Military units and formations of Belgium
Airborne units and formations of Belgium
Military units and formations disestablished in 1994
Military units and formations established in 1963
1963 establishments in Belgium
1994 disestablishments in Belgium